The Wilderness, or High Banks, is a historic home at Matthews, Talbot County, Maryland, United States. It overlooks the Choptank River and was constructed in two periods. The smaller -story, four-bay-long brick structure is attributed to the 1780-90 period, and the larger portion is in Flemish bond brick and dates to around 1815. Also on the property are two early outbuildings, a smokehouse, and dairy. It was the home of Daniel Martin, the 20th Governor of Maryland.

The Wilderness was listed on the National Register of Historic Places in 1974.

References

External links
, including photo from 1971, at Maryland Historical Trust

Houses in Talbot County, Maryland
Houses on the National Register of Historic Places in Maryland
Houses completed in 1785
National Register of Historic Places in Talbot County, Maryland